The 2017 MENA Golf Tour was the seventh season of the MENA Golf Tour. It was the first full season in which events received Official World Golf Ranking points. OWGR points were introduced during the 2016 season.

Schedule
The following table lists official events during the 2017 season.

Order of Merit
The Order of Merit was based on prize money won during the season, calculated using a points-based system. The top five players on the tour earned status to play on the 2018–19 Sunshine Tour. Todd Clements led the amateur Order of Merit.

Notes

References

MENA Golf Tour